The following highways are numbered 282:

Brazil
 BR-282

Canada
Manitoba Provincial Road 282

Japan
 Japan National Route 282

United States
 Arkansas Highway 282
 California State Route 282
 Georgia State Route 282
 Iowa Highway 282 (former)
Kentucky Route 282
 Maryland Route 282
 Minnesota State Highway 282
 Montana Secondary Highway 282
 New Mexico State Road 282
 New York State Route 282
 Ohio State Route 282
 Oregon Route 282
 Pennsylvania Route 282
 Tennessee State Route 282
 Texas State Highway 282 (former)
 Texas State Highway Loop 282
 Farm to Market Road 282 (Texas)
 Utah State Route 282
 Washington State Route 282